Peziza cerea, commonly known as the Cellar Cup is a species of ascomycete fungus in the genus Peziza, family Pezizaceae. In common with other ascomycetes the upper surface of the fungus has a layer of cylindrical spore producing cells called asci, from which the ascospores are forcibly discharged.

Description

A yellow grey to beige fungus internally, less than 5 cm across with a granular or brittle flesh. The stype is placed in a lateral position, but is small or even entirely absent. The spore colour is white, cream or yellowish; they are elliptical and smooth. The cup exterior is white in colour.

Characteristics

Peziza cerea can be initially identified by its growth in cellars, damp mortar, soil between pavement slabs, on rotting sandbags, plant material or manure. Found all year round. Its upper surface (at maturity) is usually somewhat wrinkled near the centre; a whitish and minutely fuzzy under surface; a round, cuplike shape when young, and a flattened-irregular shape when mature. The hymenium contains asci, ascospores and paraphyses. Paraphyses are sterile cells' often with swollen tips and are at high turgor pressure. Tips of the paraphyses are very tightly together at the surface of the hymenium and create a barrier; the epithecium.

A high osmotic pressure in the cells of the epithecium prevent marauding microfauna that would otherwise penetrate and feed on the rich protoplasm below. To disperse spores, asci push between the paraphyses from below, shoot off their spores then collapse.

The name Peziza means a sort of mushroom without a root or stalk.

Ecology 

Paths and cellars may sport the Cellar Cup fungus, which is saprobic.

Edibility
P. cerea is inedible.

Distribution 
P. cerea is widely distributed throughout America and Europe

See also

Peziza
Peziza repanda, the Palamino or Recurved Cup fungus
Pezizomycetes

References

External links

Google Images. Accessed : 2010-05-02
Images of P. cerea. Accessed : 2010-05-02
Wild About Britain. Accessed : 2010-05-02 (link broken)

Pezizaceae
Fungi of North America
Fungi of Europe
Taxa named by James Sowerby